Phidippus richmani is a species of jumping spider (Salticidae) native to the United States.

References 

Salticidae
Spiders described in 2004
Spiders of the United States